Gerald Ernest Gibbs, BSC (7 November 1907 – 23 January 1990) was an English cinematographer.

Selected filmography
 The Schooner Gang (1937)
 Welcome, Mr. Washington (1944)
 Don Chicago (1945)
 Loyal Heart (1946)
 No Orchids for Miss Blandish (1948)
 Alice in Wonderland (1949)
 Whisky Galore! (1949)
 High Jinks in Society (1949)
 The Lady from Boston (1951)
 Night Was Our Friend (1951)
 Johnny on the Run (1953)
 There Was a Young Lady (1953)
 The Straw Man (1953)
 Hill 24 Doesn't Answer (1955)
 The Green Man (1956)
 Fortune Is a Woman (1957)
 At the Stroke of Nine (1957)
 Blue Murder at St Trinian's (1957)
 The Safecracker (1958)
 The Man Upstairs (1958)
 Further Up the Creek (1958)
 This Other Eden (1959)
 Left Right and Centre (1959)
 The Pure Hell of St Trinian's (1960)
 A Prize of Arms (1962)
 Station Six-Sahara (1962)
 The Boys (1962 British film)
 A Jolly Bad Fellow (1964)
 The Leather Boys (1964)
 Mister Ten Per Cent (1967)

References

External links
 

1907 births
1990 deaths
British cinematographers
People from Surrey